The Human Shield is a 1991 low-budget American film from b-movie film studio Cannon Films. It was directed by Ted Post and written by Mann Rubin and stars Michael Dudikoff and Tommy Hinkley. It is about a former government agent who must save his diabetic brother from Iraqi abductors.

Plot 
In 1985, during the Iran–Iraq War, Colonel Doug Matthews (Michael Dudikoff), is a U.S. Marine hired to help train Iraqi troops to fight off the Iranians. He , arrives somewhere in the northern part of Iraq only to discover that stormtroopers are killing people in the nearby village. Doug disagrees with this and attacks Dallai, the leader of the Iraqi troops, but loses. Five years later, in August, at Baghdad Airport, the news reports that Iraq has invaded Kuwait and that all foreign nationals are to be evacuated. Ben Matthews (Tommy Hinkley), Doug's diabetic brother, who is a teacher, is taken away from his wife and child by Iraqi guards for interrogation and is held hostage to lure Doug in to a trap.

Cast
 Michael Dudikoff as Colonel Doug Matthews
 Tommy Hinkley as Ben Matthews
 Hanna Azoulay Hasfari as Lila Haddilh
 Steve Inwood as Ali Dallal
 Uri Gavriel as Tanzi
 Avi Keidar as Sager
 Gil Dagon as David
 Michael Shillo as Joe Albalo
 Roberto Pollack as Bashir
 Irving Kaplan as Sid Cromwell
 Gilat Ankori as Laura Matthews
 Megan Lawson as Laura's Baby
 Michael Eleazar as Iraqi Officer
 Avi Cohen as Blackmarketeer
 Gilya Stern as Stewardess

Reception 
Emanuel Levy of Variety magazine called it " a lame, small-budget actioner that exploits its political context without delivering the expected thrills of the genre."

References

External links
 
 

1991 films
American action drama films
Films set in 1990
Films set in Iraq
Films set in Baghdad
Films shot in Israel
Films set in Washington, D.C.
Films set in Jordan
Films directed by Ted Post
1990s action drama films
Golan-Globus films
Gulf War films
1990s English-language films
1990s American films